Volley Bergamo is an Italian women's volleyball club based in Bergamo and currently playing in the Serie A1.

Previous names
Due to sponsorship, the club have competed under the following names:
 Volley Bergamo (1991–1992)
 Foppapedretti Bergamo (1992–2000)
 Radio 105 Foppapedretti Bergamo (2000–2006)
 Play Radio Foppapedretti Bergamo (2006–2007)
 Foppapedretti Bergamo (2007–2010)
 Norda Foppapedretti Bergamo (2010–2012)
 Foppapedretti Bergamo (2012–2018)
 Zanetti Bergamo (2018–2021)
 Volley Bergamo 1991 (2021– )

History

Beginnings (1991–1994)
Volley Bergamo was founded in 1991 by Mauro Ferraris and first played in the 1991–92 Serie B1 (third tier). In the following season (1992–93) it started a partnership with Foppapedretti and gained promotion to the Serie A2 (second tier). The club gain a second successive promotion in 1993–94 by winning the Serie A2 and being promoted to the Serie A1 (first tier).

Major success (1995–2007)
In 1994–95, its debut season at Serie A1, the club finished in fifth position, earning for the first time qualification for a European competition (CEV Cup). In the following season it won both the Serie A1 and the Coppa Italia for the first time. In the 1996–97  the club won the Serie A1, Coppa Italia, Italian Super Cup and the CEV Champions League. For the next decade the club became one of the strongest women's volleyball clubs in Europe, winning another five Serie A1 (1997–98, 1998–99, 2001–02, 2003–04, 2005–06), two Coppa Italia (1997–98, 2005–06), four Italian Super Cups (1997–98, 1998–99, 1999–00, 2004–05), four CEV Champions League (1998–99, 1999–00, 2004–05, 2006–07) and one CEV Cup (2003–04).

Recent years (2008–present)
Despite not being as dominant as before, the club after 2008 won the Serie A again (2010–11), the Coppa Italia (2007–08 and 2015–16), the Italian Super Cup (2011–12) and the CEV Champions League (2008–09 and 2009–10). It is the most successful Italian team in the CEV Champions League history with 7 titles and the second most successful team in Serie A history with 8 titles, having never being relegated since its debut in the 1994–95 season.

Team

Season 2022–2023, as of June 2022.

Notable players

Retired numbers
 11  Giseli Gavio; the number was retired in 1999
 12  Francesca Piccinini; the number was retired in 2013

Head coaches
  Francesco Sbalchiero (1993–1995)
  Atanas Malinov (1995–1997)
  Marco Bonitta (1997–2000)
  Giuseppe Cuccarini (2000–2002)
  Mario Di Pietro (2002–2003)
  Giovanni Caprara (2003–2005)
  Marco Fenoglio (2005–2007)
  Lorenzo Micelli (2007–2010)
  Davide Mazzanti (2010–2012)
  Stefano Lavarini (2012–2017)
  Stefano Micoli (2017–present)

Honours

National competitions
  National League: 8
1995–96, 1996–97, 1997–98, 1998–99, 2001–02, 2003–04, 2005–06, 2010–11

  Coppa Italia: 6
1995–96, 1996–97, 1997–98, 2005–06, 2007–08, 2015–16

  Italian Super Cup: 6
1996–97, 1997–98, 1998–99, 1999–00, 2004–05, 2011–12

International competitions
  CEV Champions League: 7
1996–97, 1998–99, 1999–00, 2004–05, 2006–07, 2008–09, 2009–10

  CEV Challenge Cup: 1
2003–04

  Women's Top Volley International: 2
1996
1998 (January)

References

External links

Official website 
Official supporters website 

Italian women's volleyball clubs
Volleyball clubs established in 1991
1991 establishments in Italy
Sport in Bergamo
Serie A1 (women's volleyball) clubs